Bathymophila dawsoni is a species of sea snail, a marine gastropod mollusk in the family Solariellidae.

Distribution
This marine species is endemic to New Zealand and occurs off the Kermadec Islands.

References

 Marshall, B.A. 1979: The Trochidae and Turbinidae of the Kermadec Ridge (Mollusca: Gastropoda). New Zealand Journal of Zoology 6: 521-552
 Marshall, B.A. 1999: A revision of the Recent Solariellinae (Gastropoda: Trochoidea) of the New Zealand region. The Nautilus 113: 4-42 
 Spencer, H.G.; Marshall, B.A.; Maxwell, P.A.; Grant-Mackie, J.A.; Stilwell, J.D.; Willan, R.C.; Campbell, H.J.; Crampton, J.S.; Henderson, R.A.; Bradshaw, M.A.; Waterhouse, J.B.; Pojeta, J. Jr (2009). Phylum Mollusca: chitons, clams, tusk shells, snails, squids, and kin, in: Gordon, D.P. (Ed.) (2009). New Zealand inventory of biodiversity: 1. Kingdom Animalia: Radiata, Lophotrochozoa, Deuterostomia. pp. 161–254.
 Williams, S.T., Kano, Y., Warén, A. & Herbert, D.G. (2020). Marrying molecules and morphology: first steps towards a reevaluation of solariellid genera (Gastropoda: Trochoidea) in the light of molecular phylogenetic studies. Journal of Molluscan Studies 86 (1): 1–26.

External links
 To World Register of Marine Species

dawsoni
Gastropods of New Zealand
Gastropods described in 1979